United Nations Security Council resolution 676, adopted unanimously on 28 November 1990, after recalling resolutions 598 (1987), 618 (1988), 631 (1989), 642 (1989), 651 (1990) and 671 (1990), and having considered a report by the Secretary-General Javier Pérez de Cuéllar on the United Nations Iran–Iraq Military Observer Group, the Council decided:

(a) to renew the mandate of the United Nations Iran–Iraq Military Observer Group for another two months until 31 January 1991;
(b) to request the Secretary-General, after discussions with both parties, to report on the future of the Observer Group with his recommendations during January 1991.

See also
 Iran–Iraq relations
 Iran–Iraq War
 List of United Nations Security Council Resolutions 601 to 700 (1987–1991)

References
Text of the Resolution at undocs.org

External links
 

 0676
 0676
1990 in Iran
1990 in Iraq
November 1990 events